Kinda Don't Care is the fourth studio album by American country music artist Justin Moore. It was released on August 12, 2016 via Valory Music Group, an imprint of Big Machine Records. The album's lead single is "You Look Like I Need a Drink". The album's second single is "Somebody Else Will" released on October 17, 2016. The album's third single, its title track, was released on September 18, 2017.

Content
Moore told Rolling Stone that "Naming the album Kinda Don’t Care is not meant to be nonchalant or careless. It's meant to be a challenge to folks to live life a little more freely and be true to themselves." The album consists of 12 tracks, with four more on a deluxe version. Among the songs are the lead single "You Look Like I Need a Drink", and a duet with Brantley Gilbert on "More Middle Fingers". The track "Hell on a Highway" was originally on hold for Luke Bryan, but Moore contacted Bryan, who gave him permission to record it instead.

Reception

Critical
Giving it 4 out of 5 stars, AllMusic's Stephen Thomas Erlewine wrote that it "slyly threads in pieces of the R&B-inflected country that dominated the airwaves" and that the album's style "doesn't sound like pandering: it feels like an outgrowth of his ballad side". In 2017, Billboard contributor Chuck Dauphin placed two tracks from the album on his top 10 list of Moore's best songs: "You Look Like I Need a Drink" at number two and "Somebody Else Will" at number nine.

Commercial
The album debuted at No. 4 on the Billboard 200 based on 42,000 units, 37,000 of which are pure album sales. It also topped the Country Albums chart, which is Moore's third consecutive No. 1 on the chart. It has sold 134,800 copies in the US as of November 2017.

Track listing

Chart performance

Weekly charts

Year-end charts

Singles

References

2016 albums
Justin Moore albums
Big Machine Records albums
Albums produced by Jeremy Stover
Albums produced by Julian Raymond